Thomas Bermingham, 1st Earl of Louth (16 November 1717 – 11 January 1799) was an Anglo-Irish politician and peer. He was also the last man to be summoned to parliament as Baron Athenry.

Bermingham was the son of Francis Bermingham, 14th Baron Athenry, by his first  marriage to Lady Mary Nugent, daughter of Thomas Nugent, 4th Earl of Westmeath. He was elected to the Irish House of Commons as Member of Parliament for Galway County, sitting between 1745 and 1750, when on 4 March 1750 he succeeded his father as Baron Athenry and became a member of the Irish House of Lords. He was invested as a member of the Privy Council of Ireland, but was ejected from it in 1767  by Lord Townshend, the newly arrived  Lord Lieutenant of Ireland, who wished to make a "clean sweep" of the Irish administration, removing all those he regarded as corrupt or inefficient. On 23 April 1759 Lord Athenry was created Earl of Louth in the Peerage of Ireland, a title previously held by John de Bermingham, 1st Earl of Louth, a cousin of his remote ancestor Rickard de Bermingham.

Marriages and children
He married, firstly, Jane Bingham, the daughter of Sir John Bingham, 5th Baronet. and Anne Vesey, in November 1745. He married, secondly, Margaret Daly, the daughter of Peter Daly and Elizabeth Blake, on 10 January 1750. He died in 1799 and is buried in the Dominican Friary at Athenry, founded by his ancestor in 1241. His property was divided between his three daughters and their families. He left no surviving male issue, so his earldom became extinct. The barony fell into abeyance and  became dormant: among those who unsuccessfully claimed it after him were his grandson Thomas Sewell, and the family of John Birmingham.

His daughters were-
Elizabeth, who married firstly Thomas Bailey Heath Sewell (son of Sir Thomas Sewell, Master of the Rolls) secondly Francis Duffield and thirdly Joseph Russell 
Mary, married William St Lawrence, 2nd Earl of Howth 
Louisa, married firstly  Joseph Blake, 1st Baron Wallscourt and secondly James Daly.

References

 History of Galway, James Hardiman, Galway, 1820
 The Abbey of Athenry, Martin J. Blake, Journal of the Galway Archaeological and Historical Society, volume II, part ii, 1902
 The Birmingham family of Athenry, H.T. Knox, J.G.A.H.S., volume ten, numbers iii and iv, 1916–17.
 The Birmingham chalice, J. Rabbitte, volume 17, i and ii, 1936–37

People from County Galway
Thomas
Thomas
Members of the Privy Council of Ireland
Irish MPs 1727–1760
18th-century Anglo-Irish people
1717 births
1799 deaths
Members of the Parliament of Ireland (pre-1801) for County Galway constituencies